The following are the football (soccer) events of the year 1920 throughout the world.

Events

Winners club national championship 
Argentina: Boca Juniors, River Plate
Austria: Rapid Vienna
Belgium: Club Brugge
Denmark: B 1903
England: Liverpool FC
France: no national championship
Germany: 1. FC Nürnberg
Hungary: MTK Hungária FC
Iceland: Víkingur
Italy: Internazionale Milano F.C.
Luxembourg: CS Fola Esch
Netherlands: Be Quick
Paraguay: Club Libertad
Poland: not finished due to Polish-Soviet War; most probably champions would have been Cracovia
Scotland: For fuller coverage, see 1919-20 in Scottish football.
Scottish Division One – Rangers
Scottish Cup – Kilmarnock
Sweden: Djurgårdens IF
Uruguay: Nacional
Greece: 1913 to 1921 - no championship titles due to the First World War and the Greco-Turkish War of 1919-1922.

International tournaments
 1920 British Home Championship (October 25, 1919 – April 10, 1920)

Olympic Games in Antwerp, Belgium (August 28 – September 2, 1920)
 
 
 
 South American Championship 1920 in Chile (September 11, 1920 – October 3, 1920)

Births
 January 15 – Anton Malatinský, Slovak international football player and coach (died 1992)
 January 31 – Bert Williams, English international goalkeeper (died 2014)
 March 3 – Elio Bianchi, retired Italian professional footballer
 April 14 – Schubert Gambetta, Uruguayan international footballer (died 1991)
 June 26 – Ernst Melchior, Austrian international footballer (died 1978)
 November 7 – Ignacio Eizaguirre, Spanish international footballer (died 2013)

Deaths

Clubs founded 
 Cagliari Calcio
 Empoli FC

References 

 
Association football by year